Gorsko-Popovsky is a rural locality (a khutor) in Dobrinskoye Rural Settlement, Uryupinsky District, Volgograd Oblast, Russia. The population was 8 as of 2010.

Geography 
Gorsko-Popovsky is located in forest steppe, 12 km northwest of Uryupinsk (the district's administrative centre) by road. Gorsky is the nearest rural locality.

References 

Rural localities in Uryupinsky District